The 2005–06 Maltese Premier League (known as the BOV Premier League for sponsorship reasons) was the 26th season of the Maltese Premier League, and the 91st season of top-level league football in Malta. Birkirkara won the title while Mosta and Ħamrun Spartans were relegated to the Maltese First Division.

Teams 

The following teams were promoted from the First Division at the start of the season:
 Mosta
 Ħamrun Spartans

From the previous Premier League season, the following teams were relegated to the First Division:
 St. Patrick
 Lija Athletic

First phase

League table

Results

Second phase

Top Six 

The teams placed in the first six positions in the league table qualified for the Top Six, and the points obtained during the first phase were halved (and rounded up) before the start of second phase. As a result, the teams started with the following points before the second phase: Birkirkara 21 points, Sliema Wanderers 20, Hibernians 19, Marsaxlokk 17, Valletta 12 and Msida Saint-Joseph 11.

Play-out 

The teams which finished in the last four league positions were placed in the play-out and at the end of the phase the two lowest-placed teams were relegated to the First Division. The points obtained during the first phase were halved (and rounded up) before the start of second phase. As a result, the teams started with the following points before the second phase: Floriana 10 points, Ħamrun Spartans 10, Pietà Hotspurs 8, Mosta 4.

Season statistics

Top scorers

References

External links
Malta - List of final tables (RSSSF)

Maltese Premier League seasons
Mal
1

lt:Maltos pirmoji futbolo lyga